Le Petit Bras (French for the little arm) may refer to:

 Le Petit Bras (Le Gros Bras tributary), Capitale-Nationale, Quebec, Canada
 Le Petit Bras (Amédée River tributary), Côte-Nord, Quebec, Canada

See also
 Le Gros Bras